Buprestis fasciata is a species of metallic wood-boring beetle in the family Buprestidae. It is found in the Caribbean Sea and North America.

Subspecies
These two subspecies belong to the species Buprestis fasciata:
 Buprestis fasciata fasciata
 Buprestis fasciata fortunata Casey

References

Further reading

External links

 

Buprestidae
Articles created by Qbugbot
Beetles described in 1787